Quentin David Wheeler  (born  April 27, 1955, in Long Branch, New Jersey) is an American track and field athlete.  He had the misfortune to be one of the best 400 meter hurdlers in the world at the same time as Edwin Moses was invincible in the event.  Wheeler ran in the 1976 Olympics, finishing fourth behind Moses at his debut on the international scene.  Only Yevgeny Gavrilenko kept the United States from sweeping the event that year.

Less than two months before the Olympics, it was Wheeler running for San Diego State University who was the NCAA Champion.  Wheeler set his personal record of 48.39 at the 1979 Mt. SAC Relays.

Raised in Tinton Falls, New Jersey, Wheeler graduated in 1974 from Monmouth Regional High School, where he was inducted into the school's Hall of Fame in 1993.

References

External links
 

1955 births
Living people
Monmouth Regional High School alumni
People from Tinton Falls, New Jersey
Sportspeople from Long Branch, New Jersey
Track and field athletes from New Jersey
San Diego State University alumni
San Diego State Aztecs men's track and field athletes
American male hurdlers
Athletes (track and field) at the 1976 Summer Olympics
Olympic track and field athletes of the United States
Sportspeople from Monmouth County, New Jersey